The Deutscher Bücherpreis (English: German Book Prize) was a non-monetary prize for literature which was awarded at the Leipzig Book Fair by the German Publishers and Booksellers Association from 2002 to 2004.

After September 2004, the Association stopped awarding the prize. Starting from autumn 2005, the Association has instead awarded the similarly named Deutscher Buchpreis at the Frankfurt Book Fair, to a single German-language novel each year. At the Leipzig Book Fair, the Leipzig Book Fair Prize has been awarded since spring 2005, in three categories: fiction, nonfiction and translation.

Listed below are the prizewinners of the award by category. The Deutscher Buchpreis, which replaced the award, is awarded to only one German-language book each year.

2002 

German Fiction: Ulla Hahn, Das verborgene Wort
International Fiction: Per Olov Enquist, Der Desuch des Leibarztes
Biography/Contemporary History: Günter de Bruyn, Preußens Luise
Nonfiction: Dietrich Schwanitz, Männer
Guidebook: Alfred Biolek and Eckart Witzigmann, Unser Kochbuch
Children's and Young Adult: Mirjam Pressler, Malka Mai
Debut: Juli Zeh, Eagles and Angels
Lifetime Achievement: Christa Wolf
Audience Pick: J. K. Rowling, Harry Potter and the Goblet of Fire

2003 

German Fiction: Doris Dörrie, The Blue Dress
International Fiction: Ian McEwan, Atonement
Biography/Contemporary History: Peter Merseburger, Willy Brandt 1913-1992
Nonfiction: Katja Kullmann, Generation Ally
Guidebook: Vitali and Wladimir Klitschko, Unser Fitnessbuch
Children's and Young Adult: Paul Maar, Sams in Gefahr
Debut: Zsuzsa Bánk, Der Schwimmer
Lifetime Achievement: Peter Härtling
Audience Pick: Henning Mankell, Die Rückkehr des Tanzlehrers

2004 

Fiction: Yann Martel, Life of Pi
Nonfiction: Michael Moore, Stupid White Men
Children's and Young Adult: Eoin Colfer, Artemis Fowl: The Eternity Code
Debut: Yadé Kara, Selam Berlin
Lifetime Achievement: Mirjam Pressler
Audience Pick: Éric-Emmanuel Schmitt, M. Ibrahim and the Flowers of the Koran

References

German literary awards